The Croatian–Venetian wars were a series of periodical, punctuated medieval conflicts and naval campaigns waged for control of the northeastern coast of the Adriatic Sea between the City-state (later the Republic) of Venice and the Principality of Croatia (later turned to the Kingdom of Croatia, as well as the Kingdom of Croatia in personal union with Hungary), at times allied with neighbouring territories – the Principality of the Narentines and Zahumlje in the south and Istrian peninsula (then partially ruled by the German feudal families) in the north. First struggles occurred at the very beginning of the existence of two conflict parties (7th and 8th century), they intensified in the 9th century, lessened during the 10th century, but intensified again since the beginning of the 11th century.

From the year 1000 Venetian forces managed to subjugate a lot of coastal towns of the Byzantine Theme of Dalmatia, which was ceded from the Byzantine Emperor to the Croatian King. From the 1030s however, after the fall of Doge Otto Orseolo, Croatian kings Stjepan I and his son Petar Krešimir IV succeeded in taking almost the whole coast back, so the latter carried the title King od Croatia and Dalmatia. Since 1085, following the  agreement between Venice and Byzantine Empire, Venetians subsequently conquered the significant part of the Croatian coastline.

During the 12th century, after Croatia entered a personal union with the Kingdom of Hungary, Croato-Hungarian kings Coloman and Béla II managed to return a considerable territory of Dalmatia and Croatian Littoral to their kingdom, but occasional conflicts almost never ceased. Since that Croatian–Venetian wars were technically theaters of the more wider Hungarian–Venetian Wars. When Louis the Great, the new young king (ruled 1342–1382), decided to expel Venetians from his country, he launched a large campaign in 1356–1358 and forced them to withdraw from Dalmatia. Zadar Peace Treaty was signed on 18 February 1358 and the whole coast from eastern Istria to southern Dalmatia was set free.

In 1409 the Republic of Venice used the opportunity of the dynastic struggle that occurred and bought Dalmatia for 100,000 ducats from the Croatian anti-king Ladislaus of Naples, establishing Venetian Dalmatia. Croatian Littoral and eastern Istria remained parts of Croatia, where Croats, together with their allies, rejected Venetian efforts to subject them and fought against Venetians in conflicts like War of the Holy League and Uskok War. Thus a couple of decades after the purchase of Dalmatia by Venice, the Croatian–Venetian Wars became part of larger conflicts of the world's Great powers and were turned into the Ottoman–Venetian wars and Habsburg–Venetian wars.

Warfare until 887

Conflicts between Venetians and Croats, as well as other Slavic nations or tribes on the Adriatic coast, including Narentines, began very early, in the 7th and 8th century, because the Venetians demanded free passage for their merchant galleys and did not want to pay taxes to Croats. In the 9th century Venetian Doge Giovanni I Participazio fought against Narentines, but concluded a peace treaty in 830. A few years later another warfare broke out, but ended with a new peace treaty of 839 among Doge Pietro Tradonico, Duke Mislav of Croatia and Prince Družak (Drosaico) of the Narentines. Occasional hostilities started again a bit later and repeated several times during next years.

The situation even worsened after Duke Domagoj acceded the Croatian throne (ruled 864-876). John the Deacon, Venetian Chronicler, wrote at the beginning of the 11th century that Domagoj was pessimus Sclavorum dux (meaning the worst Duke of Slavs), because of the latter's numerous wars, especially against the Venice the Arabs. The Venetian navy under command of Doge Orso I Participazio attacked Croatian territory in 865, having some success, and another peace agreement followed, securing the safe passage of Venetian ships in the Adriatic Sea. In 871 or 872 a new intense naval-commercial war on the sea between Croats and Venetians broke out, ending after Domagoj's death.

One of the decisive battles for dominance in the Adriatic Sea in that period happened on 18. September 887 between the Narentines and Venetians at Makarska. Doge Pietro I Candiano led personally his fleet in a campaign against Narentines but they crushed his forces and killed him in the battle.

Situation between 887 and 1000

Following Pietro Candiano's death, the Venetians started to pay Croats and Narentines an annual tribute for the right to sail and trade in the northeastern Adriatic. Between 887 and 948 there was no new war recorded between Venetians and Croats. In 948 Doge Pietro III Candiano launched a naval campaign to combat Narentines, but his military attempt failed. The result was a peace treaty that made the Most Serene Republic of Venice pay taxes for safe passage for the next 50 years.

This situation lasted until the end of the 10th century. Having come to power, Doge Pietro II Orseolo began the period of southeastern expansion of Venice, refusing to pay tribute to Croats and launching military expeditions against them. After the death of King Stjepan Držislav in 997, Kingdom of Croatia was weakened due to the dynastic crisis and civil war that broke out among his three sons for the throne succession. This enabled Venetians in the following years to take control over Croatian towns and islands in the theme of Dalmatia.

Warfare after 1000

The Venetian Armada led by Orseolo succeeded in taking over coastal towns from Rab (Arba) in the north to Dubrovnik (Ragusa) in the south, including islands of Vis (Issa), Lastovo (Lagosta) and Korčula (Curzola), either with using armed forces or calm surrender. The bloodiest conflict was the battle of Lastovo in 1000, at the end of which the town of Lastovo was completely destroyed and the survivors displaced.

The Republic of Saint Mark secured its suzerainty over the area until the 1030s, after  which the Croatian King Stjepan I, having come to power, took control over the town of Zadar. He and his son Petar Krešimir IV succeeded in taking other coastal towns back from Venetians. Since 1085 however, following the Byzantine–Venetian Treaty of 1082, Venice subsequently conquered a large part of the Croatian coastal and maritime territory. 

In 1105 the new Croatian king, Coloman of Hungary, launched campaign against Venetians, which was approved by Byzantine Emperor, and returned the northeastern Adriatic coast under the crown. Ten years later, Doge Ordelafo Faliero managed to retake some of the disputed area: he conquered Zadar and several other towns but lost his life in a battle. A peace treaty was then concluded, according to which Zadar devolved upon Venice, while Biograd, Šibenik, Trogir and Split remained in the Kingdom of Croatia in personal union with Hungary.

A new Venetian military campaign was undertaken in 1125 and Doge Domenico Michele's forces captured Split and Trogir. King Béla II liberated these two towns in 1133, but until the end of the 12th century several further naval campaigns of Venice followed, so that the warfare was almost permanent. In 1180 King Béla III managed to free Zadar and the whole area between the rivers  Krka and Neretva. Since Venetians did not give up subjugating Zadar, another war between Venice and the town of Zadar (supported by the King) broke out and lasted twenty years (1183-1203), ending with the Crusaders' capture of the town.

Crusaders' capture of Zadar in 1202

The Crusaders' capture of Zadar was a consequence of an agreement between the crusaders and the Republic of Venice for transport across the sea, whose price far exceeded what the crusaders were able to pay. As a solution Venetians proposed that the crusaders help them capture Zadar, a constant battleground between Venice on one side and Croatia and Hungary on the other.

Although many crusaders had refused to take part in the siege of the catholic town, the attack started in November 1202. After fierce fighting, Zadar fell on 24 November and the Venetians and the crusaders pillaged the town. After spending the winter in Zadar, the crusaders continued their campaign (Fourth Crusade) in the first days of the springtime. In 1203, Pope Innocent excommunicated the whole crusading army, along with the Venetians, for taking part in this attack, but Zadar remained under the control of Venice.

Period between 1203 and 1358

During the periodical Venetian reign in Zadar in the 13th century and the first half of the 14th century, the citizens of Zadar rebelled several times against the authorities of the Most Serene Republic and had support of the Croato-Hungarian kings. Major armed conflicts were recorded in 1242, 1247, 1311 and 1345–1346.

At the same time, the Venetian authorities forced Dubrovnik to accept their governor, after the local Rector Damjan Juda refused it and committed suicide in 1205. Having installed its own governor, Venice subsequently took control over the southernmost part of Croatian lands.

In the north, Venetians ruled western and southern Istria from the 13th and 14th century, after military interventions in major towns, as follows: in Pula in 1148, 1243, 1267, 1331 and 1397; in Rovinj in 1283, in Poreč in 1354, in Novigrad in 1270 and 1358, in Umag in 1269 and 1370. The Republic wanted all the time to take central and eastern Istria as well, but never succeeded in achieving permanent control over Pazin area and eastern coast of the peninsula, despite many heavy military clashes with their German owners, whose seat was in the Pazin Castle. Although the local population was primarily Croatian, the feudal owners were of German descent and carried the title of Margraves of Istria.

In 1342 Louis the Angevin became Croato-Hungarian king and the pushing of Venetian forces from the northeastern Adriatic area soon became one of the principal goals of his foreign policy. In 1346 he tried to help citizens of Zadar during the Venetian siege, but failed. In summer 1356 he launched a large military campaign and attacked all the Venetian held territories of his country. Within a year and a half, his armies entered Zadar, Split, Trogir, Šibenik and other Croatian coastal towns. In the Treaty of Zadar, which was signed on 18 February 1358 in the Monastery of St. Francis, the Republic of Venice renounced all Dalmatian towns and islands between the Gulf of Kvarner and the Town of Drač/Durazzo (in present-day Albania) in favour of King.

Situation after 1358

The peace period after the Treaty of Zadar lasted in Dalmatia approximately 50 years. Following the dynasty crisis at the end of the 14th and the beginning of the 15th century, and the struggle for the crown between Sigismund of Luxembourg and Ladislaus of Naples,  the latter sold in 1409 his rights over Dalmatia to the Republic of Venice for the sum of 100,000 ducats. This led to the formation of the Venetian Dalmatia, while Croatian Littoral, including the island of Krk, remained part of Croatia.

Several decades later a new rising military force came to the area from the east, the mighty  Ottoman Empire, and caused a new series of wars on the Croatian coast: Ottoman–Venetian wars, Ottoman–Habsburg wars and Habsburg–Venetian wars (which included War of the Holy League, Uskok War and others).

See also 
 Timeline of the Republic of Venice
 Timeline of Croatian history
 History of the Croatian Navy
 History of the Byzantine Empire
 History of the Republic of Venice
 History of Croatia

External links 

 Prince Domagoj tried to liberate Istria from the Franks but failed as the Venetians drove his troops out
 Venetian doges led war fleets against Croatia
 Venetian naval expeditions to Dalmatia in the 9th century
 [http://hbl.lzmk.hr/clanak.aspx?id=5070 Domagoj – The worst duke of Slavs“ (Sclavorum pessimo duce) for the Venetians] (in Croatian) Peter II Orseolo invaded Dalmatia and defeated Croatian navy
 In 1018, the Venetians returned to Croatia for a major offensive and drove the Croatian leaders from various towns
 Following the Golden Bull of 1082, Byzantine Emperor recognized Venice's nominal suzerainty over Dalmatia in 1085 (in Croatian) After the Arpad dynasty died out, a war of succession ensued and the Venetians took Croatian towns in Dalmatia
 Wars between Zadar and Venice (in Croatian)''
 Constant struggles between Croatia and Venice in the Middle Ages

Military history of the Mediterranean
Wars involving medieval Croatia
Wars involving the Republic of Venice
Military history of the Byzantine Empire
Wars involving the Republic of Pisa
Venetian period in the history of Croatia
History of Dalmatia
9th-century conflicts
10th-century conflicts
11th-century conflicts
12th-century conflicts
13th-century conflicts
14th-century conflicts
9th century in Croatia
10th century in Croatia
9th-century military history of Croatia
10th-century military history of Croatia
11th-century military history of Croatia
12th-century military history of Croatia
13th-century military history of Croatia
14th-century military history of Croatia
9th century in the Republic of Venice
10th century in the Republic of Venice
11th century in the Republic of Venice
12th century in the Republic of Venice
13th century in the Republic of Venice
14th century in the Republic of Venice